A list of  narrow-gauge railways in the United Kingdom.

The worldwide usage of locomotives on railways, including  gauge railways, has its origins in the United Kingdom in the early 19th century during the Industrial Revolution. In fact, in 1802, a  gauge plateway-type railway owned by the Coalbrookdale Company in England became the first railway in the world to have a locomotive designed and built for it. The locomotive's designer, Richard Trevithick, is credited with making the first recorded successful demonstration of a locomotive on rails (in 1804 on a different railway in Wales).  gauge locomotive-powered railways, along with other narrow-gauge railways of varying widths, would later become one of the most common railway gauges chosen for short-distance lines in the British Isles, such as those found in mines and industrial sites (see table below).

Railways

See also

British narrow-gauge railways
Heritage railway
2 ft and 600 mm gauge railways in the United Kingdom
2 ft 6 in gauge railways in the United Kingdom
3 ft gauge railroads in the United States
Three foot six inch gauge railways in the United Kingdom

References

External links
Southend Pier Railway - official website
Llechwedd Slate Caverns - official website